Coleman Nunatak is a nunatak located near the head of Berry Glacier,  south of Patton Bluff in Marie Byrd Land. It was mapped by the United States Geological Survey from surveys and from U.S. Navy air photos, 1959–65, and named by the Advisory Committee on Antarctic Names after Richard I. Coleman, United States Antarctic Research Program meteorologist at Byrd Station, 1962.

References 

Nunataks of Marie Byrd Land